Theodoros Mingos (born 6 February 1998) is a Greek professional footballer who plays as a central midfielder for Super League 2 club Thesprotos.

Career
He plays mainly as a central midfielder, and joined Panathinaikos from the youth ranks of Panathinaikos in the summer of 2016. He signed a 4-year contract that keeps him in Panathinaikos until 30 June 2020.

On 3 July 2019, he joined OFI on a three-year deal.

References

External links

1998 births
Living people
Greece under-21 international footballers
Greece youth international footballers
Greek expatriate footballers
Panathinaikos F.C. players
Super League Greece players
Association football midfielders
Olympiakos Nicosia players
OFI Crete F.C. players
Rodos F.C. players
Expatriate footballers in Cyprus
Greek expatriate sportspeople in Cyprus
Footballers from Athens
Greek footballers